My Oedipus Complex may refer to:

 A short story written by Frank O'Connor
 One of a number of singles in the Kid Rock discography